The Man I Love is a 1997 French gay romance television film directed by Stéphane Giusti. It was originally made for French television, a co-production between Arte and La Sept. It was broadcast in 1997. It was then released internationally as a film on 27 April 2001.

Plot
It follows a love story between two men at a swimming pool. Martin (Marcial Di Fonzo Bo), a brash pool monitor and resident lifeguard Lucas (Jean-Michel Portal). Martin becomes interested in the younger and attractive Lucas but Lucas has a live-in girlfriend, Lise (Mathilde Seigner), so he is initially resisted. Later, Lise starts to integrate Martin into Lucas and Lisa's social life. Lucas then begins to doubt his heterosexuality and starts falling for Martin. But Martin is declared HIV-positive, which forces Lucas to choose between the terminally ill man he starts to love and his first love Lise.
The motto "Live each day of your life as if it were your last" is the main theme of the film.

Cast
 Jean-Michel Portal as Lucas 
 Marcial Di Fonzo Bo as Martin 
 Mathilde Seigner as Lise 
 Vittoria Scognamiglio as Rose
Other cast members; Jacques Hansen, Stephane Leveque, Karim Lounis, Bernard Nissile, Bruno Bonomo, Benjamin Sanchiarelli, Serguei Tourountsev, Nedjib Djebarri, Louis Philippe Lopez and Elizabeth Giusti

DVD release
The Man I Love was released on Region 1 (U.S. and Canada) DVD on 11 November 2003.

References

External links
 

1990s French-language films
1997 romantic drama films
1997 television films
1997 films
French television films
French romantic drama films
French LGBT-related films
HIV/AIDS in French films
LGBT-related romantic drama films
1997 LGBT-related films
1990s French films